Roberts Creek or Robert Creek may refer to:

Roberts Creek, British Columbia, a community in Canada
Roberts Creek (Iowa), a tributary of the Turkey River
Robert Creek (Minnesota)

See also
Roberts Branch (disambiguation)